Terjit is an oasis (in the proper sense: a desert spring or other water source), 45km by road south of Atar and popular with tourists in Mauritania. It nestles in a gorge on the western edge of the Adrar plateau with the palm grove stretching a few hundred metres alongside a stream which emerges from a spring. Terjit is part of the commune of Maaden in the Aoujeft Department.

There is a modest fee to enter and tourists can pay to stay in tents in the palm grove. It is often used for tourism for its charm, fresh water and shade.

Historically, it has been used for religious ceremonies, especially wedding ceremonies, as well as the coronation of a few African princes.

Gallery

Climate

References

External links
Looklex, Mauritania: Terjit

Adrar Region
Populated places in Mauritania
Oases of Africa